Robert Monclar (13 August 1930 – 4 December 2012) was a French basketball player. He competed in the men's tournament at the 1952 Summer Olympics, the 1956 Summer Olympics and the 1960 Summer Olympics.

References

External links
 

1930 births
2012 deaths
French men's basketball players
Olympic basketball players of France
Basketball players at the 1952 Summer Olympics
Basketball players at the 1956 Summer Olympics
Basketball players at the 1960 Summer Olympics
Sportspeople from Hérault
1954 FIBA World Championship players
1950 FIBA World Championship players